Jingle All the Way 2 is a 2014 American direct-to-video Christmas comedy film, and a sequel to the 1996 film Jingle All the Way starring Arnold Schwarzenegger. Directed by Alex Zamm, Jingle All the Way 2 stars Larry the Cable Guy and Santino Marella. The film is produced by 20th Century Fox and WWE Studios, the motion picture division of WWE, and was released straight-to-video by Fox on December 2, 2014. On-air promotion from WWE occurred on its weekly episodic events.

Plot

Truck driver Larry Phillips competes with the current husband of his ex-wife, the wealthy businessman Victor, for daughter Noel's affection. Larry tries to find out what Noel wants most by surreptitiously opening Noel's letter to Santa Claus (which appears to be phonetically written) by offering to mail it for her.

He then tries to buy what he believes is her heart's desire; a Harrison The Talking Bear toy, which also happens to be the toy of the season.  However, new stepfather Victor sends his spy, a man he employs named Welling to follow Larry and find out what it is Noel wants, so he can be the one to fulfill her dreams.  Victor is determined to make it impossible for Larry to get his hands on a Harrison Bear by having Welling buy every one he can find and thwarting Larry each time he tries to get his hands on one.

Victor stockpiles all of the bears he acquires in a room in his box company.  Larry tricks Victor into giving away the location of the bears and follows him into the room where they are kept but accidentally locks them both in.

At the tree lighting ceremony in town, a savvy female reporter has investigated who bought all the bears (Welling) and outs him to all the parents at the ceremony who have tried to buy one for their child.  She declares Victor as the true villain which causes the crowd to focus their anger against Victor and his box company instead of him.

Meanwhile, inside the box company, Larry and Victor have discovered what is going on and finally come together to save the situation.  They decide to have Christmas together and give Noel the prized toy from both of them, only to find out Noel never wanted the toy at all.  They question her not wanting the toy and point out it was in her letter to Santa Claus.  Noel accuses Larry of betraying her trust regarding the letter, which Larry makes an excuse for finding and reading the letter which he then produces; the letter, to his and Victor's surprise, when correctly interpreted, says something completely different from what he had thought: she wanted her family all together as one.

Cast

 Larry the Cable Guy as Larry Phillips
 Brian Stepanek as Victor Baxter
 Santino Marella as Claude
 Kennedi Clements as Noel Phillips
 Kirsten Robek as Trish Phillips-Baxter
 Rachel Hayward as Maggie
 Matty Finochio as Jeffrey
 Eric Breker as Nate Welling
 Brenda Crichlow as Reporter Margo Price (Brenda M. Crichlow)
 Alex Zamm as Harrison Bear (voice)

Production

Filming
Jingle All the Way 2 was filmed in Fort Langley, British Columbia, Canada.

Reception

Critical response
Dave Schilling of Vice wrote, "What's actually insidious about the whole endeavor is that it's so good at being so bad."

See also
 List of Christmas films

References

External links
 
 

2014 films
2010s Christmas comedy films
2014 direct-to-video films
American Christmas comedy films
2010s English-language films
Direct-to-video comedy films
Direct-to-video sequel films
Films about toys
Films directed by Alex Zamm
Films shot in British Columbia
WWE Studios films
20th Century Fox direct-to-video films
2014 comedy films
Films about father–daughter relationships
2010s American films